The Double Jinx Mystery is the fiftieth volume in the Nancy Drew Mystery Stories  series. It was first published in 1973 under the pseudonym Carolyn Keene. The actual author was ghostwriter Harriet Stratemeyer Adams.

Plot summary
This volume details the story of a family zoo and aviary, believed to have been jinxed by people out to take their land for high rise development. Nancy Drew and her friends must get to the bottom of the mystery, before they are jinxed themselves.

References

External links
The Double Jinx Mystery at Fantastic Fiction

Nancy Drew books
1973 American novels
1973 children's books
Novels set in zoos
Grosset & Dunlap books
Children's mystery novels